Daisy & Ollie is a British children's animated series for preschoolers produced by CHF Entertainment and Hoopla Studio for Cartoonito and Channel 5's Milkshake! block. The show follows the daily life of two little kids named Daisy and Ollie, along with Daisy's father, Boo the purple monkey and Whizzy the toy robot. As of 8 March 2021, new episodes have also appeared concurrently on Channel 5.

Format
In each episode, the characters have a day at Daisy's house and during each of their life situations, Daisy and Ollie ask Daisy’s Daddy a question (said question is also the title of each episode). After they've found out the answer to this question, they sing the Questions song and Daddy gives advice to the viewers about the question and signs off.

In some episodes, there are special guest appearances from other famous TV stars like Paddy McGuinness, Kirsty McKay, Paul Grunert, and Romesh Ranganathan, along with Take That member and performer Gary Barlow, all appearing as cartoon caricatures of themselves.

References

External links
 Daisy & Ollie Website
 Daisy & Ollie at Channel 5's website

2017 British television series debuts
2010s British children's television series
2010s British animated television series
2020s British children's television series
2020s British animated television series
British children's animated adventure television series
Cartoonito original programming
Channel 5 (British TV channel) original programming
British flash animated television series
Television series by Cosgrove Hall Films
British preschool education television series
Animated preschool education television series
2010s preschool education television series
2020s preschool education television series
Animated television series about children
English-language television shows